Leipzig University, in Leipzig in Saxony, Germany, is one of the world's oldest universities and the second-oldest university (by consecutive years of existence) in Germany. The university was founded on 2 December 1409 by Frederick I, Elector of Saxony and his brother William II, Margrave of Meissen, and originally comprised the four scholastic faculties. Since its inception, the university has engaged in teaching and research for over 600 years without interruption.

Famous alumni include Gottfried Wilhelm von Leibniz, Johann Wolfgang von Goethe, Leopold von Ranke, Friedrich Nietzsche, Robert Schumann, Richard Wagner, Tycho Brahe, Georgius Agricola, Angela Merkel and ten Nobel laureates associated with the university.

History

Founding and development until 1900 

The university was modelled on the University of Prague, from which the German-speaking faculty members withdrew to Leipzig after the Jan Hus crisis and the Decree of Kutná Hora. The Alma mater Lipsiensis opened in 1409, after it had been officially chartered by Pope Alexander V in his Bull of Acknowledgment on (9 September of that year). Its first rector was Johannes Otto von Münsterberg. From its foundation, the Paulinerkirche served as the university church. After the Reformation, the church and the monastery buildings were donated to the university in 1544. In order to secure independent and sustainable funding, the university was endowed with the lordship over nine villages east of Leipzig (university villages). It kept this status for nearly 400 years until land reforms were carried out in the 19th century. 

Like many European universities, the University of Leipzig was structured into colleges (collegia) responsible for organising accommodation and collegiate lecturing. Among the colleges of Leipzig were the Small College, the Large College, the Red College (Rotes Kolleg, also known as the New College), the college of our Lady (Frauenkolleg) and the Pauliner-College (Pauliner Kolleg). There were also private residential halls (bursen, see English 'bursaries'). The colleges had jurisdiction over their members. The college structure was abandoned later and today only the names survive.

During the first centuries, the university grew slowly and was a rather regional institution. This changed, however, during the 19th century when the university became a world-class institution of higher education and research. At the end of the 19th century, important scholars such as Bernhard Windscheid (one of the fathers of the German Civil Code) and Wilhelm Ostwald (viewed as a founder of modern physical chemistry) taught at Leipzig.

Leipzig University was one of the first German universities to allow women to register as "guest students". At its general assembly in 1873, the  thanked the University of Leipzig and Prague for allowing women to attend as guest students. This was the year that the first woman in Germany obtained her JD, Johanna von Evreinov.

During the decline and dissolution of the Ottoman Empire in the 19th and first decade of 20th century together with some other German universities Leipzig University turned into one of the centers of higher education for state administrations and elites of newly independent Balkan states (Romania, Greece, Bulgaria and Serbia) educating over 5,500 students from the region in 1859–1909 period.

Until the beginning of the Second World War, Leipzig University attracted a number of renowned scholars and later Nobel Prize laureates, including Paul Ehrlich, Felix Bloch, Werner Heisenberg and Sin-Itiro Tomonaga. Many of the university's alumni became important scientists.

Nazi period 

Under Nazi rule many degrees of Jews were cancelled. Some were later reinstated as Karl-Marx University degrees by the GDR. Noteworthy Nazis, such as Max Clara (chair of anatomy) taught at the university and were appointed to positions with great authority.

The university was kept open throughout World War II, even after the destruction of its buildings. During the war the acting rector, Erich Maschke, described the continuation of the university in a memo on 11 May 1945, announcing the vote for a new rector:

By the end of the war 60 per cent of the university's buildings and 70 per cent of its books had been destroyed.

The university under the German Democratic Republic 
The university reopened after the war on 5 February 1946, but it was affected by the uniformity imposed on social institutions in the Soviet occupation zone. In 1948 the freely elected student council was disbanded and replaced by Free German Youth members. The chairman of the Student Council, Wolfgang Natonek, and other members were arrested and imprisoned, but the university was also a nucleus of resistance. Thus began the Belter group, with flyers for free elections. The head of the group, Herbert Belter, was executed in 1951 in Moscow. The German Democratic Republic was created in 1949, and in 1953 for Karl Marx Year the university was renamed by its government the Karl Marx University, Leipzig after Karl Marx. In 1968, the partly damaged Augusteum, including Johanneum and Albertinum and the intact Paulinerkirche, were demolished to make way for a redevelopment of the university, carried out between 1973 and 1978. The dominant building of the university was the University Tower (now City-Hochhaus Leipzig), built between 1968 and 1972 in the form of an open book.

After the reunification of Germany 

In 1991, following the reunification of Germany, the university's name was restored to the original Leipzig University (Alma mater lipsiensis). The reconstruction of the University Library, which was heavily damaged during the war and in the GDR barely secured, was completed in 2002.

With the delivery of the University Tower to a private user, the university was forced to spread some faculties over several locations in the city. It controversially redesigned its historical centre at the Augustusplatz. In 2002, Behet Bonzio received the second prize in the architectural competition; a first prize was not awarded by the jury. A lobby with partial support of the provincial government called for the rebuilding of St. Paul's Church and Augusteum. This caused the resistance of the university leadership, the majority of the students and population of Leipzig. On 24 March 2004 a jury chose a design by Dutch architect Erick van Egeraat, which was well received by almost all parties. He recalls the outer form of the St. Paul's Church (today called Paulinum) and Augusteum, and abstracted the original building complex. Renovations began in the summer of 2005.

In 2008 the university was able to prevail in the nationwide "Initiative of Excellence" of Germany and it was granted the graduate school "BuildMoNa: Leipzig School of Natural Sciences – Building with Molecules and Nano-objects". In addition, the university was able to receive grants from the Saxon excellence initiative for the "Life" project – a project that tries to explore common diseases more effectively. Also in 2008 the "Bach Archive" was associated with the university. In 2009, the Leipzig University celebrated its 600th anniversary with over 300 scientific and cultural lectures and exhibitions, reflecting the role of the university's research and teaching from its beginning.

Campus 
The university's urban campus comprises several locations. All in all, the university is spread across 38 locations in Leipzig. The main buildings in the city center (district Mitte) are still located on the same land plots as the earliest university buildings in 1409. The university's buildings in the center of Leipzig underwent substantial reconstruction from 2005, the new university's main building being drafted by Dutch architect Erick van Egeraat. The estimated total cost for the renovation project is 140 million euros. The new buildings were scheduled to be completed in 2009/2010, in time for the university's 600th anniversary celebrations.

Besides the faculties and other teaching institutions, several other bodies serve the university: the University Library, a university archive and administration, numerous museums (e.g. the Museum for Music Instruments and the Museum of Ancient Egypt) and the university hospital. The university's Leipzig Botanical Garden, the second-oldest botanical garden in Europe. was established in 1542.
The university's Musical Instrument Museum includes one of the world's three surviving pianos built by Bartolomeo Cristofori, the piano's inventor. Five other Cristofori instruments are included in the Museum's collections.

Key Central institutions of the university are

 Centre for Biotechnology and Biomedicine
 Career Service
 Deutsches Literaturinstitut Leipzig/DLL
 German Centre for Integrative Biodiversity Research (iDiv) Halle-Jena-Leipzig
 Higher Education Didactics Centre Saxony
 Kustodie (Art Collection)
 Leipzig University Music
 Leipzig Research Centre Global Dynamics
 Research Academy Leipzig
 Language Centre
 Saxon Preparatory Courses (Studienkolleg Sachsen)
 Translational Centre for Regenerative Medicine Leipzig
 University Archive
 University Library
 University Computer Centre
 Centre for University Sport
 Centre for Teacher Training and School Research
 Centre for Media and Communikation

Library 
The University Library of Leipzig was established in 1543. It is one of the oldest German university libraries and it serves as a source of literature and information for the Leipzig University as well as the general public in the region. Its extensive historical and special collections are nationally and internationally recognized. The library consists of the main building "Bibliotheca Albertina" and forty branches situated near their respective academic institutions. The current stock comprises 5 million volumes and about 7,700 periodicals. Collections range from important medieval and modern manuscripts to incunabula, papyri, autographs, ostraka and coins. The Apel Codex, a manuscript of 16th century music, is housed in the Leipzig University library, as well as the Papyrus Ebers.

The Leipzig University Library also owns parts of the Codex Sinaiticus, a Bible manuscript from the 4th century, brought from Sinai in 1843 by Constantin von Tischendorf. Papyrus Ebers is the longest and oldest surviving medical manuscript from ancient Egypt, dated to around 1600 BC. The Codex contains large parts of the Old Testament and a complete New Testament in ancient Greek, and is one of the most important known manuscripts of the Greek Old Testament and the New Testament. It is the oldest fully preserved copy of the New Testament.

Some of the University Library locations in Leipzig are:

 Bibliotheca Albertina at Beethovenstraße 6
 Campus Library at Universitätsstr. 3
 Library of Deutsches Literaturinstitut at Wächterstr. 34
 Library of Arts at Dittrichring 18–20
 Library of Musicology at Neumarkt 9–19
 Library of Law at Burgstr. 27
 Library of Medicine at Johannisallee 34
 Library of Medicine at Käthe-Kollwitz-Str. 82
 Library of Veterinary Medicine at the Tierkliniken 5
 Library of Biosciences at Talstr. 35
 Library of Chemistry and Physics at Johannisallee 29
 Library of Earth Sciences at Talstr. 35
 Library of Geography at Johannisallee 19
 Library of Archaeology, Prehistory and Ancient History at Ritterstr. 14
 Library of Oriental Studies at Schillerstr. 6
 Library of Sports Science at Jahnallee 59

In addition to the university library, one of the two centers of the German National Library is based at Leipzig, the collections of which are open to use for academic research.

Faculties 
The original four facilities were the Faculty of Arts, Theology, Medicine, and Law. As of November 2021, the university comprises the following 14 faculties with institutes and centers associated with each one.

 Faculty of Chemistry and Mineralogy
 Institute of Analytical Chemistry
 Institute of Bioanalytical Chemistry
 Institute of Chemical Technology
 Institute of Inorganic Chemistry
 Institute of Mineralogy, Crystallography and Materials Science
 Institute of Organic Chemistry
 Wilhelm Ostwald Institut of Physical and Theoretical Chemistry
		
 Faculty of Economics and Management Science
 Institute of Accounting, Finance and Taxation (IUFB)
 Institute of Building Design and Management (IGB)
 Institute of Business Education and Management Training (IFW)
 Institute of Economic Policy (IWP)
 Institute of Empirical Economic Research (IEW)
 Institute of Information Systems 
 Institute of Infrastructure and Resource Management (IIRM)
 Institute of Insurance Science (IVL)
 Institute of Public Finance and Public Management (PFPM)
 Institute of Real Estate Management (IIM)
 Institute of Service and Relationship Management (ISRM)
 Institute of Theoretical Economics (ITVWL)
 Institute of Trade and Banking (IHB)
 Institute of Urban Development and Construction Management (ISB)

 Faculty of Education
 Institute of Educational Sciences
 Institute of Pre-Primary and Primary Education
 Institute of Special and Inclusive Education

 Faculty of History, Arts and Regional Studies
 Department of History
 Institute of African Studies
 Institute of Ancient Near Eastern Studies
 Institute of Anthropology
 Institute of Art Education
 Institute of Art History
 Institute of East Asian Studies
 Institute of Egyptology
 Institute of Musicology
 Institute of Oriental Studies
 Institute of South and Central Asian Studies
 Institute of the Study of Religions
 Institute of Theatre Studies

 Faculty of Law
 Ernst Jaeger Institute of Corporate Restructuring and Insolvency Law
 Institute of Broadcasting Law
 Institute of Energy and Regulatory Law
 Institute of Environmental and Planning Law
 Institute of Foreign and European Private and Procedural Law
 Institute of German and International Law of Banking and Capital Markets
 Institute of International Law
 Institute of Labour and Social Law
 Institute of Law and Politics
 Institute of Public International Law, European Law and Foreign Public Law
 Institute of Tax Law
 Institute of the Foundations of Law
 Institute of the Legal Profession

 Faculty of Life Sciences
 Institute of Biochemistry
 Institute of Biology
 Wilhelm Wundt Institute of Psychology

 Faculty of Mathematics and Computer Science
 Institute of Computer Science
 Institute of Mathematics

 Faculty of Medicine
 Carl Ludwig Institute of Physiology
 Centre for Clinical Trials Leipzig
 Centre for Environmental Medicine and Environmental Epidemiology
 Clinical Pharmacology
 Experimental Centre of the Faculty of Medicine
 General Medicine Unit
 Heart Center Leipzig GmbH
 Innovation Center Computer Assisted Surgery (ICCAS)
 Institute for Medical Physics and Biophysics
 Institute of Anatomy
 Institute of Biochemistry (medicine)
 Institute of Legal Medicine
 Institute of Medical Informatics, Statistics and Epidemiology
 Institute of Social Medicine, Occupational Health and Public Health
 Integrated Research and Treatment Center (IFB) AdiposityDiseases
 Interdisciplinary Centre for Clinical Research
 Karl-Sudhoff-Institute of History of Medicine and Science
 LIFE Forschungszentrum für Zivilisationserkrankungen (LIFE)
 Neurological Rehabilitation Centre
 Paul Flechsig Institute for Brain Research
 Rudolf Boehm Institute of Pharmacology and Toxicology
	
 Faculty of Philology
 Institute of American Studies
 Institute of Applied Linguistics and Translatology
 Institute of British Studies
 Institute of Classical Studies and Comparative Literature
 Herder-Institute (German as a Foreign Language)
 Institute of German Language and Literature
 Institute of Linguistics
 Institute of Romance Studies
 Institute of Slavonic Studies
 Institute of Sorbian Studies

 Faculty of Physics and Earth Sciences
 Institute of Geography
 Institute of Geophysics and Geology
 Institute of Meteorology
 Peter Debye Institute of Soft Matter Physics
 Felix Bloch Institute of Solid State Physics
 Institute of Theoretical Physics

 Faculty of Social Sciences and Philosophy
 Institute of Communication and Media Studies
 Institute of Global and European Studies 
 Institute of Philosophy
 Institute of Political Science
 Institute of Sociology
 Institute of the Study of Culture

 Faculty of Sport Science
 Institute of Sport Medicine and Prevention
 Institute of General Kinesiology and Athletics Training
 Institute of Movement and Training Science in Sports I
 Institute of Movement and Training Science in Sports II
 Institute of Exercise and Public Health
 Institute of Sport Psychology and Physical Education
	
 Faculty of Theology
 Institute of Church History
 Institute of New Testament Science
 Institute of Old Testament Studies
 Institute of Practical Theology
 Institute of Religious Education
 Institute of Systematic Theology

 Faculty of Veterinary Medicine
 Department for birds and reptiles
 Department for horses
 Department for ruminants and swine
 Department for small animal
 Institute of Anatomy, Histology and Embryology
 Institute of Animal Hygiene and Veterinary Public Health
 Institute of Animal Nutrition, Nutrition Diseases and Dietetics
 Institute of Bacteriology and Mycology
 Institute of Food Hygiene
 Institute of Immunology
 Institute of Parasitology
 Institute of Pathology
 Institute of Pharmacology, Pharmacy and Toxicology
 Institute of Physiological Chemistry
 Institute of Physiology
 Institute of Virology
 Oberholz Farm for Teaching and Research

Institutes affiliated with the university 
 International Max Planck Research School- Mathematics in the Sciences (IMPRS MiS), in association with Max Planck Institute for Mathematics in the Sciences
 International Max Planck Research School on Neuroscience of Communication: Function, Structure, and Plasticity, in association with Max Planck Institute for Human Cognitive and Brain Sciences
 International Max Planck Research School "The Leipzig School of Human Origins", in association with Max Planck Institute for Evolutionary Anthropology
 Institute of Non-Classical Chemistry e.V
 Institute for Applied Informatics
 Simon Dubnow Institute for Jewish History and Culture at Leipzig University 
 Leipzig Centre for the History and Culture of East Central Europe 
 Translational Centre for Regenerative Medicine
 German Centre for Integrative Biodiversity Research (iDiv)
 Institute of East Asian Studies of the Leipzig University
 Institute of Classical Archaeology of the Leipzig University
 Institute for International Law, European Law and Foreign Public Law (InVEA) of the Leipzig University

Academics 
Today, the university has 14 faculties. With over 29,000 students, it is Saxony's second-largest university. There are now more than 150 institutes and the university offers 190 study programs leading to Bachelor's degrees, Master's degrees, Staatsexamen, Diplom (equivalent to Master's degree) and Ph.D.s.
The university offers a number of courses in English and other foreign languages, and there are several programs which have been specially designed for foreign students. Exchange partner universities include the universities of Arizona, Oklahoma, Houston, Alberta, Ohio, and Edinburgh. Traditionally contacts to universities in Eastern Europe and the Far East are strong as well, e.g. there are cooperations with leading institutions such as Moscow's Lomonosov University and Renmin University in Beijing.There are several International Master's programs: American Studies, Global Studies, Sustainable Development Studies, SEPT (MBA in SME Promotion) and one Bachelor/Master's/Ph.D. program (International Physics Studies Program) taught in English. American Studies Leipzig was awarded three international professorships: The Fulbright-Leipzig Chair for American Studies, the DAAD Professorship for American and International Studies, and the Picador Guest Professorship for Literature. It is also the home of Aspeers – Emerging voices in American Studies, a graduate-level peer-reviewed scholarly journal for American studies. Erasmus Mundus Global Studies is an interdisciplinary, research-based Master offered by a consortium of five European universities: Leipzig University, the London School of Economics, University of Vienna, University of Wroclaw and Roskilde University. In the field of anthropology, the university is cooperating with the Leipzig Max Planck Institute for Evolutionary Anthropology. In 1995, the Leibniz-Institute for Jewish History and Culture named after Simon Dubnow was formed as a research institution related to the university. Since 2008 the university is also home to one of Germany's few Confucius Institutes. The institute is based on an agreement of June 2006 between the university administration and representatives of the Chinese Embassy to establish a Confucius Institute in cooperation with the Renmin University and the "National Office for Teaching Chinese as a Foreign Language". Leipzig University has been the home of the first German chair for Chinese and East Asian Languages in the 19th century, which later became the Institute of East Asian Studies, which still exists today (see Georg von der Gabelentz).

Rankings 

The university is ranked 18th in Germany, 98th in Europe, and 264th in the world by the web-based Webometrics Ranking of World Universities, a ranking evaluating universities' scientific online publications. The 2018 ARWU ranking sees Leipzig climbing in the 151–200 tier being among the top 14 German universities. Leipzig has constantly been ranked among the German top 10 in various university sport disciplines over the past decades.

International students
Leipzig university has a large body of international students. In winter term 2017, out of its 28,797 students about 11% (3,174) were foreign students.

Student life 
Leipzig has a thriving student life with a large number of student run bars, sports clubs and recreational facilities for students. The student body in Leipzig is diverse, not only due to the broad spectrum of subjects at the university but also because of the other higher education institutions in the city. The Moritzbastei is the largest student club in Germany, it is part of the historic city fortifications of Leipzig and is famous for its atmosphere and large number of cultural events.

The university is home to the Leipzig Academic Orchestra and the University Choir of Leipzig. There are numerous courses offered in performing arts every semester and a dance festival is organised by students once a year. In the field of sports, the university offers training opportunities and courses in almost all disciplines. During the annual Leipzig book fair, the university library and other university institutions organise public events for authors.

Notable people 

Leipzig University has produced many notable individuals and noble laureates. Some famous people affiliated with Leipzig include:

Music
 Johann Christoph Altnickol, German composer, son-in-law to Johann Sebastian Bach
 Johann Friedrich Agricola, German composer, pupil of Johann Sebastian Bach
 Carl Philipp Emanuel Bach, German composer, second famous son of Johann Sebastian Bach
 Johann Christoph Friedrich Bach, German composer, 3rd famous son of Johann Sebastian Bach
 Wilhelm Friedemann Bach, German composer, first famous son of Johann Sebastian Bach
 Lorenz Christoph Mizler, German composer and music theorist, pupil of Johann Sebastian Bach
 Friedrich Blume, German music theorist
 Robert Schumann, German music composer
 Christoph Graupner, German composer
 Johann Kuhnau, German composer, Thomaskantor
 Johann David Heinichen, German composer and music theorist, Royal Polish and Electoral Saxon Kapellmeister
 Richard Wagner, German composer
 Georg Philipp Telemann, German composer, godfather to Carl Philipp Emanuel Bach

Humanities
 Theodor Mommsen, German historian, Nobel Prize in Literature
 Franz Delitzsch, German Theologian and Hebrew Scholar
 Michael Ranft, German historian and theologian.
 Friedrich Nietzsche, German philosopher
 Johann Wolfgang von Goethe, German poet and polymath
 Max Muller, philologist and Orientalist who wrote authoritative works on Indology. 
 Leonard Bloomfield, American linguist who led the development of structural linguistics in the United States during the 1930s and the 1940s. He is considered to be the father of American Distributionalism.
 Hans-Georg Gadamer, German philosopher and rector of the university
 Johann Christoph Gottsched, German poet, author, and critic
 Christian Friedrich Henrici, German poet, Saxon Actuary, Postal clerk, Postal Commissioner, and Wine inspector
 Gotthold Ephraim Lessing, German philosopher and writer
 Lin Yutang, Chinese author and linguist
 Nathan Söderblom, Swedish clergyman, Nobel Peace Prize
 C. F. W. Walther, first President of the Lutheran Church–Missouri Synod and its most influential theologian.
 Ferdinand de Saussure, linguist, founder of structuralism

Sciences
 Gottfried Wilhelm von Leibniz, German Mathematician who developed calculus, philosopher, polymath
 Felix Klein, German mathematician, known for his work in group theory, complex analysis and non-Euclidean geometry
 Sophus Lie, Norwegian mathematician who developed Lie algebra
 August Ferdinand Möbius, German mathematician and theoretical astronomer, known for the Möbius strip.
 Karl Mollweide, German mathematician and astronomer, known for the Mollweide projection
 Hermann Hankel, German mathematician, known for the Hankel transform
 Felix Hausdorff, German mathematician, one of the founders of modern topology, known for the Hausdorff space
 Bartel Leendert van der Waerden, Dutch mathematician
 Johann Samuel Traugott Gehler German mathematician, physicist and lawyer, author of 'Physikalisches Wörterbuch'
 Edgar Odell Lovett, American mathematician
 Wei-Liang Chow, Chinese mathematician and stamp collector born in Shanghai, known for his work in algebraic geometry.
 Johann Heinrich Winckler, German physicist 
 Werner Heisenberg, German physicist, Nobel Prize in Physics
 Felix Bloch, Swiss physicist, Nobel Prize in Physics
 Friedrich Hund, German physicist, discovered quantum tunnelling and is known for Hund's rules 
 Julius Edgar Lilienfeld, Austro-Hungarian physicist
 Ludwig Boltzmann, Austrian physicist
 Tycho Brahe, Danish astronomer
 Gustav Hertz, German physicist, Nobel Prize in Physics
 Sin-Itiro Tomonaga, Japanese physicist, Nobel Prize in Physics
 William Vermillion Houston, American physicist
 Edward Teller, Hungaro-American nuclear scientist, member of the Manhattan Project
 Peter Debye, Dutch-American physicist and chemist, Nobel Prize in Chemistry
 Wilhelm Ostwald, German chemist, Nobel Prize in Chemistry
 Paul Ehrlich, German doctor, Nobel Prize in Medicine
 Svante Pääbo, Noble Prize in Medicine, currently teaches molecular evolutionary biology at the university
 Gustav Theodor Fechner, German psychologist, founder of Psychophysics
 Maximilian von Frey, physiologist, inventor of the esthesiometer
 Ernst Heinrich Weber, German physician and professor whose studies paved the way for the founding of Psychology
 Wilhelm Wundt, German psychologist, founded the first formal laboratory for psychological research
 Friedrich Trendelenburg, German surgeon, described surgical removal of pulmonary emboli

Politics
 Luo Gan, Chinese Politician, Member of the Politburo Standing Committee
 Johann Major, German Lutheran theologian, a principal author of the so-called Leipzig Interim, and author of the Majoristic Controversy
 Angela Merkel, first female German Chancellor 
 Hans-Dietrich Genscher, German politician, Foreign Minister and Vice Chancellor
 Rudolph Sohm, lawyer and Church historian
 Cai Yuanpei, president of Peking University and leading thinker in the early Chinese communist movement
 Michelle Bachelet, first female President of Chile between 2006 and 2010
 Selig Brodetsky, Israeli President of the Hebrew University of Jerusalem
 Raila Amolo Odinga, Kenyan politician

Sports
 Luz Long, German Olympic long-jumper, noted for his sportsmanship

See also 
 Handelshochschule Leipzig (HHL)
 Leipzig school (sociology)
 List of medieval universities
 List of universities in Germany

Notes

References

Literature

External links 

  of Leipzig University
 History of the Leipzig University
 

 
1400s establishments in the Holy Roman Empire
1409 establishments in Europe
Educational institutions established in the 15th century
Tourist attractions in Leipzig
Universities and colleges in Saxony